Townsville Stingers Rugby League Club are an Australian rugby league football club based in Townsville formed in 1998. The team played in the Queensland Cup before exiting in the 1998 season.

References

Rugby clubs established in 1998
Sport in Townsville
Rugby league teams in Queensland
1998 establishments in Australia